Murrumbidgee is the name of a river in New South Wales, Australia.  It may refer to:

 Murrumbidgee River
 Murrumbidgee River Railway Bridge
 Murrumbidgee Irrigation Area
 Murrumbidgee Red Gums Important Bird Area
 Murrumbidgee Co-operative Milling, defunct flour-milling company
 Murrumbidgee District, historical district
 Murrumbidgee Shire, local government area
 Murrumbidgee, 1977 album by The Bushwackers (band)
 Murrumbidgee electorate, a current Australian Capital Territory Legislative Assembly electorate
 Electoral district of Murrumbidgee, a former New South Wales Legislative Assembly district